The 1962 Jordan League was the 15th season of Jordan Premier League, the top-flight league for Jordanian association football clubs. Al-Faisaly won its 6th title.

Overview
Al-Faysali won the championship.

References

RSSSF

External links
 Jordan Football Association website

Jordanian Pro League seasons
Jordan
Jordan
football